Pretty Empowered is a professional wrestling stable currently signed to the National Wrestling Alliance (NWA) consisting of Ella Envy, Kenzie Paige, and Roxy. Envy and Paige are former two-time NWA World Women's Tag Team Champions.

History
On March 20, 2022 at the Crockett Cup, Envy and Paige, under the name Pretty Empowered, made their NWA debut together, losing to the NWA World Women's Tag Team Champions The Hex. On June 11, 2022, at Alwayz Ready, Pretty Empowered defeated the Hex to win the World Women's Tag Team Championships. This would lead them to a rematch against The Hex on the NWA 74th Anniversary Show for said championships, successfully defending in a Street Fight where Paige also turned heel. On September 27, at Pretty Empowered Surge in which they hosted, Envy and Paige introduced Roxy as their third member of Pretty Empowered.

On December 24, 2022, at NWA Christmas Special, Envy and Paige defeated The Renegade Twins who had made their NWA debut. On the February 7, 2023 episode of NWA Powerrr, Envy and Roxy lost to the Renegade Twins, which earned the latter a title shot at Nuff Said. On February 11, at Nuff Said, Envy and Paige lost their NWA World Women's Tag Team Championship bout to the Renegade Twins by pinfall, but on the February 21st episode of NWA Powerrr, Pretty Empowered (known in that match as Pretty Empowered 2.0) regained the titles back from the Renegade Twins, but lost the titles again to Madi Wrenkowski and Missa Kate.

Championships and accomplishments
National Wrestling Alliance
NWA World Women's Tag Team Championship (2 times) – Envy and Paige; Envy and Roxy
New South Pro Wrestling
New South Tag Team Championship (1 time) – Envy and Paige
 Pro Wrestling Illustrated
 Ranked No. 71 of the top 100 Tag Teams in the PWI Tag Team 100 in 2022

References

National Wrestling Alliance teams and stables
Independent promotions teams and stables
Women's wrestling teams and stables